The 1892 Recreo earthquake took place in the Catamarca Province of Argentina on 21 March at about 01:45 AM, with magnitude of 6.0 on the Richter magnitude scale.

The earthquake had a maximum felt intensity of VII on the Mercalli intensity scale. It caused some fatalities and serious structural damage in the town of Recreo.

See also
 List of earthquakes in Argentina
 List of historical earthquakes

References
  Instituto Nacional de Prevención Sísmica. Listado de Terremotos Históricos.

1892
Geology of Catamarca Province
Recreo Earthquake, 1892
1892 earthquakes
March 1892 events
1892 disasters in Argentina